Hampsonia is a genus of moths belonging to the family Zygaenidae.

Species
Species:

Hampsonia bifasciata 
Hampsonia pulcherrima

References

Zygaenidae
Zygaenidae genera